Michel Destot (born 2 September 1946) is a member of the National Assembly of France.  He represents the Isère department,  and is a member of the Socialiste, radical, citoyen et divers gauche. He was the mayor of Grenoble between 1995 and 2014, when his chosen successor was defeated by Éric Piolle.

References

1946 births
Living people
Mayors of Grenoble
Socialist Party (France) politicians
Arts et Métiers ParisTech alumni
Deputies of the 12th National Assembly of the French Fifth Republic
Deputies of the 13th National Assembly of the French Fifth Republic
Deputies of the 14th National Assembly of the French Fifth Republic